Louisiana French is an umbrella term for the dialects and varieties of the French language spoken traditionally by French Louisianians in colonial Lower Louisiana. As of today Louisiana French is primarily used in the state of Louisiana, specifically in its southern parishes.

Over the centuries, the language has incorporated some words of African, Spanish, Native American and English origin, sometimes giving it linguistic features found only in Louisiana. Louisiana French differs to varying extents from French dialects spoken in other regions, but Louisiana French is mutually intelligible with other dialects and is most closely related to those of Missouri (Upper Louisiana French), New England, Canada and northwestern France.

It is a misconception that no one in Louisiana spoke or wrote Standard French. The resemblance that Louisiana French bears to Standard French varies depending on the dialect and register, with formal and urban variants in Louisiana more closely resembling Standard French.

Figures from the United States Census record that roughly 7% of Louisianans over the age of 5 report speaking French or a French-based creole at home. Distribution of these speakers is uneven, however, with the majority residing in the south-central region known as Acadiana. Some of the Acadiana parishes register francophone populations of 10% or more of the total, with a select few (such as Vermilion, Evangeline and St. Martin Parishes) exceeding 15%.

French is spoken across ethnic and racial lines by people who may identify as Cajuns, Creoles as well as Chitimacha, Houma, Biloxi, Tunica, Choctaw, Acadians, and French Indians among others. For these reasons, as well as the relatively small influence Acadian French has had on the region, the label Louisiana French or Louisiana Regional French is generally regarded as more accurate and inclusive than "Cajun French" and is the preferred term by linguists and anthropologists. However, "Cajun French" is commonly used in lay discourse by speakers of the language and other inhabitants of Louisiana.

Louisiana French should further not be confused with Louisiana Creole, a distinct French-based creole language indigenous to Louisiana and spoken across racial lines. In Louisiana, language labels are often conflated with ethnic labels, and Cajun-identified speakers might therefore call their language "Cajun French" even when linguists would identify it as Louisiana Creole. Likewise, many Creoles of various backgrounds (including Cajuns) do not speak Louisiana Creole but rather Louisiana French.

Parishes in which the dialect is still found include Acadia, Allen, Ascension, Assumption, Avoyelles, Cameron, Evangeline, Iberia, Jefferson Davis, Lafayette, Lafourche, St. Landry, St. Martin, St. Mary, Terrebonne, Pointe Coupée, Vermilion, and other parishes of southern Louisiana.

History

Colonial Louisiana 

Starting in the second half of the 17th century, several trading posts were established in Lower Louisiana eventually giving way to greater French colonial aspirations with the turn of the century. French immigration was at its peak during the 17th and 18th centuries which firmly established the Creole culture and language there. One important distinction to make is that the term "créole" at the time was consistently used to signify native, or "locally-born" in contrast to "foreign-born". In general the core of the population was rather diverse, coming from all over the French colonial empire namely Canada, France, and the French West Indies.Eventually, with the consistent relations built between the Native American tribes and francophones, new vocabulary was adopted into the colonial language. For example, something of a "French-Choctaw patois" is said to have developed primarily among Louisiana's Afro-French population and métis Creoles with a large portion of its vocabulary said to be of Native American origin.

Prior to the late arrival of the Acadian people in Louisiana, the French of Louisiana had already begun to undergo changes as noted by Captain Jean-Bernard Bossu who traveled with and witnessed Jean-Baptiste Le Moyne speaking this "common language." This unusual blend of French was also noticed by Pierre-Clement de Laussat during a lunch visit with the Creole-French Canterelle family. Upon the arrival of their Houma relatives, the family began conversing in "French and Choctaw." Additional witness to this variety of French comes from J.F.H. Claiborne, a cousin of Louisiana's first American Governor, who also noted the "unusual patois of provincial French and Choctaw."

Starting in 1755, large populations of the French-speaking Acadians began to arrive en masse along the Mississippi River as well as eventually arriving all the way to south to the modern-day state of Louisiana following the Great Upheaval. In 1762, France relinquished their territorial claims to Spain just as Acadians had begun to arrive; despite this, Spanish Governor Bernardo de Gálvez, permitted the Acadians to continue to speak their language as well as observe their other cultural practices. The original Acadian community was composed mainly of farmers and fishermen who were able to provide their children with a reasonable amount of schooling.

However, the hardships after being exiled from Nova Scotia, along with the difficult process of resettlement in Louisiana and the ensuing poverty made it difficult to establish schools in the early stages of the community's development. Eventually schools were established, as private academies whose faculty had recently arrived in Louisiana from France or who had been educated in France. Children were usually able to attend the schools only long enough to learn counting and reading. At the time, a standard part of a child's education in the Cajun community was also the Catholic catechism, which was taught in French by an older member of the community. The educational system did not allow for much contact with Standard French. It has often been said that Acadian French has had a large impact on the development of Louisiana French but this has generally been over-estimated.

19th century 
French immigration continued in the 19th century until the start of the American Civil War, bringing large numbers of francophones speaking something more similar to today's Metropolitan French to Louisiana. Over time, through contact between different ethnic groups, the various dialects converged to produce what we know as Louisiana French. The 1845 Louisiana constitution permitted any legislator to address the body in either English or French, and the 1845 and 1852 constitutions required all laws to be written in both English and French.

The 1864 Louisiana constitution abandoned the dual language requirement and directed public instruction to be conducted in English, although Article 128 prohibited the state from barring French speakers from public office. The post-Civil War constitution of 1868 further stated that "no laws shall require judicial process to be issued in any [language] other than the English language". However, French was still the most spoken language in many parishes of Louisiana, and the constitution of 1879 adjusted the previous restrictions to require that laws "be promulgated and preserved in the English language; but the General Assembly may provide for the publication of the laws in the French Language, and prescribe that judicial advertisements in certain designated cities and parishes…be made in that language." It also allowed primary school to teach in French, a provision that was extended in the 1898 and 1913 constitutions to include secondary schools.

Decline in the early 20th century 
In 1921, the new Louisiana constitution reversed the previous language rights and banned the teaching of French in all public schools. The constitution established English as the official language of Louisiana, which pushed French out of New Orleans to its current location in southwestern parts of the state. The education and religious services of Louisiana eventually fell prey to English, and the eventual consequence of speaking French was that speaking French became a sign of cultural illegitimacy. Parents viewed the practice of teaching their children English as the intrusion of a foreign culture, and many refused to send their children to school. When the government required them to do so, they selected private French Catholic schools in which class was conducted in French. Derogatory terms and phrases were used by English speakers to put social pressure on French speakers ("Don't speak Cajun. Speak White!"), a sentiment later expressed in Michèle Lalonde's 1974 poem "Speak White" ("Speak white... be civilized"). The French schools worked to emphasize Standard French, which they considered to be the prestige dialect. When the government required all schools, public and parochial, to teach in English, new teachers, who could not speak French, were hired. Children could not understand their teachers and generally ignored them by continuing to speak French. Eventually, children were subjected to corporal punishment for speaking French on school grounds.

The punishment system (which was not dissimilar to the manner in which children attempting to speak both immigrant and indigenous languages other than English were dealt with in schools elsewhere in North America) seems to have been responsible for much of the decay that Louisiana French experienced in the 20th century since, in turn, people who could not speak English were perceived as uneducated. Therefore, parents became hesitant to teach French to their children, hoping that the children would have a better life in an English-speaking nation. As of 2011, there were an estimated 150,000 to 200,000 people in Louisiana who speak French. By comparison, there were an estimated one million native French-speakers in Louisiana in about 1968. The dialect is now at risk of extinction as children are no longer taught it formally in schools.

Many question whether the Louisiana French language will survive another generation. Some residents of Acadiana are bilingual though, having learned French at home and English in school. Currently, Louisiana French is considered an endangered language.

Decline in World War II 
The war compelled many Cajun people to leave their home state of Louisiana for the first time and serve in the military. Cajun GIs most of whom could neither speak nor understand English encountered solely English-speaking Americans, but learned it in order to serve and survive in the military.

Back on the home front, many Cajun civilians united with other Anglo-Americans to support the war effort by volunteering as air raid wardens, plane spotters, firefighters, auxiliary policemen, nursing aides, as well as participating in bond, stamp, and scrap drives. These activities which the Cajuns participated in promoted feelings of national unity, and drew the Cajuns closer to Mainstream America. During this time period, emphasis on the 'American way of life' had a massive impact on Cajun children: census data shows that the use of Cajun French as a first language dropped 17 percent for Cajuns born during US involvement in WW2, the single largest decrease since the beginning of the 20th century, and also resulted in the practice of punishing Cajun students for speaking French at school.

Preservation efforts 
Marilyn J. Conwell of Pennsylvania State University conducted a study of Louisiana French in 1959 and published in 1963 the book Louisiana French Grammar, which has been regarded as "probably the first complete study of a Louisiana French dialect". Conwell focused on the French spoken in Lafayette, Louisiana, and evaluated what was then its current status. She pointed out that the gradual decline of French made it "relatively common" to find "grand-parents who speak only French, parents who speak both French and English, children who speak English and understand French, and grand-children who speak and understand only English." The decision to teach French to children was well-received since grandparents hoped for better opportunities for communicating with their grandchildren.

The Council for the Development of French in Louisiana (CODOFIL) was established in 1968 to promote the preservation of French language and culture in Louisiana. The Louisiana state legislature has greatly shifted its stance on the status of French. Since the passage of Legislative Act No. 409 in 1968, the Louisiana governor is granted the authorization "to establish the Council for the Development of Louisiana-French" and that the agency is to consist of no more than fifty members, including a chairman. The name was soon changed to CODOFIL and was granted the power to "do anything possible and necessary to encourage the development, usage and preservation of French as it exists in Louisiana".

In 1984, Jules O. Daigle, a Roman Catholic priest, published A Dictionary of the Cajun Language the first dictionary devoted to "Cajun French". Once considered an authority on the language, it is however not exhaustive; it omits alternate spellings and synonyms that Father Daigle deemed "perversions" of the language but are nonetheless popular among so-called Louisiana French speakers and writers. Though remaining useful today, Daigle's dictionary has been superseded by the Dictionary of Louisiana French (2010), edited by Albert Valdman and other authorities on the language.

Beginning in the 1990s, various signage, packaging, and documentation in French became present throughout the state. State and local tourism bureau commissions were influential in convincing city, parish and state officials to produce bilingual signage and documentation. French and English bilingual signage is, therefore, usually confined to the old districts of cities, like the French Quarter in New Orleans, downtown Lafayette and New Iberia (trilingual with Spanish), St. Martinville, Breaux Bridge, as well as several other cities. Locals continue to refer to the place names in English and for postal services, English is generally preferred. To meet the demands of a growing francophone tourist market, tourism bureaus and commissions throughout the state, particularly in southern Louisiana, have information on tourist sites in both French and English as well as in other major languages spoken by tourists.

Recent developments 
Many young adults are learning enough French to understand French music lyrics. Also, there is now a trend to use French-language websites to learn the dialect. Culinary words and terms of endearment such as "cher"  (dear) and "nonc" (uncle) are still heard among otherwise English-speaking Louisianians.

An article written online by the Université Laval argues that the state of Louisiana's shift, from an anti-French stance to one of soft promotion has been of great importance to the survival of the language. The article states that it is advantageous to invigorate the revival of the language, to better cherish the state's rich heritage, and to protect a francophone minority that has suffered greatly from negligence by political and religious leaders. Furthermore, the university's article claims that it is CODOFIL rather than the state itself which sets language policy; the only political stance the state of Louisiana makes is that of noninterference. All of this culminates in the fact that outside the extremely southern portions of the state, French remains a secondary language that retains heavy cultural and identity values.

According to Jacques Henry, former executive director of CODOFIL, much progress has been made for francophones and that the future of French in Louisiana is not merely a symbolic one. According to statistics gathered by CODOFIL, the past twenty years has seen widespread acceptance of French-immersion programs. He goes further to write that the official recognition, appreciation by parents, and inclusion of French in schools reflects growing regard of the language. Ultimately the survival of French in Louisiana can only be guaranteed by Louisianan parents and politicians, but that there is still hope. Similarly, the state legislature passed the Louisiana French Language Services Act in 2011 with particular mention to cultural tourism, local culture, and heritage. The bill sets forth that each branch of the state government shall take necessary action to identify employees who are proficient in French. Each branch of the state government is to take necessary steps in producing services in the French language for both locals and visitors. This bill is, however, an unfunded state mandate. The legislative act was drafted and presented by francophone and francophile senators and representatives as it asserts that the French language is vital to the economy of the state.

In October 2018, through an initiative launched by Scott Tilton and Rudy Bazenet, Louisiana became the first U.S. state to join the Organisation Internationale de la Francophonie. Since Louisiana joined the Francophonie, new organizations have launched to help revitalize Louisiana French, including the Nous Foundation.

Grassroots initiatives remain popular among francophone subsections of Louisianian society, often organized through online platforms such as Facebook. French-language initiatives founded in the late 2010s and early 2020s include Télé-Louisiane, a multimedia platform; Charrer-Veiller, a podcast (defunct as of 2022); LaCréole, another podcast; and Le Bourdon de la Louisiane, a web gazette. Poetry remains the most popular medium of literary expression, with poets such as Kirby Jambon and Ashlee Michot receiving international attention.

As with other cases of language revitalization (such as Irish), young Louisianians may speak a more standardized French than their forebears, having learned French both at school and via the greater community. Among such youths, the influence of vernacular Louisiana French on their speech patterns varies from speaker to speaker, depending on such factors as ethnic background, socioeconomic class, exposure to francophones of the elder generation, educational level, political beliefs and personal preference.

Given increased levels of education in Standard French and greater exposure to the international francophonie, it is likely Louisiana French will continue to evolve in this manner, with some traditionally Louisianian words and linguistic features being retained while others slowly fade.

Population 
Reliable counts of speakers of Louisiana French are difficult to obtain as distinct from other varieties of French. However, the vast majority of native residents of Louisiana and east and southeast Texas who speak French are likely speakers of Louisiana French.

In Louisiana, the population of French speakers was approximately 115,183. These populations were concentrated most heavily in the southern, coastal parishes.

In Texas, the French-speaking population was 55,773, though many of these were likely immigrants from France and other locations, living in the urban areas. Nevertheless, in the rural eastern/southeastern Texas counties of Orange, Jefferson, Chambers, Newton, Jasper, Tyler, Liberty, and Hardin alone—areas where it can be reasonably presumed that almost all French speakers are Louisiana French speakers—the total French-speaking population was composed of 3,400 individuals. It is likely a substantial portion of the 14,493 speakers in Houston's Harris county are also Louisiana French speakers. With this in mind, a marked decline in the number of French speakers in Texas has been noticed in the last half of the twentieth century. For example, at one point the French-speaking population of Jefferson County was 24,049 as compared to the mere 1,922 today. Likewise, in Harris County the French-speaking population has shifted from 26,796 to 14,493 individuals.

Louisiana French-speaking populations can also be found in southern Mississippi and Alabama, as well as pockets in other parts of the United States.

Grammar
Despite ample time for Louisiana French to diverge, the basic grammatical core of the language remains similar or the same as Standard French. Even so, it can be expected that the language would begin to diverge due to the various influences of neighboring languages, changing francophone demographics, and unstable opportunities for education. Furthermore, Louisiana French lacks any official regulating body unlike that of Standard French or Québec French to take part in standardizing the language.

Pronouns
{| class="wikitable"
! scope="col" | Person
! scope="col" | Subject Pronoun
! scope="col" | Direct Object
! scope="col" | Indirect Object
! scope="col" | Reflexive
! scope="col" | Disjunctive Pronoun
|-
! scope="row" | 1st singular
| je / j || me / m || me / m || me / m || moi
|-
! scope="row" | 2nd singular informal
| tu / t || te / t''' || te / t || te / t || toi|-
! scope="row" | 2nd singular formal1
| vous || vous || vous || vous || vous|-
! scope="row" | 3rd singular
| il (i'); elle (e') / alle (a'); ça || le (l'); la (l') / lé (l') || lui / y || se / s || lui; elle; ça|-
! scope="row" | 1st plural
| on; nous2 || nous || nous || se / s || nous-autres (même)|-
! scope="row" | 2nd plural
| vous-autres || vous || vous || vous / vous-autres / se / s || vous-autres (même)|-
! scope="row" | 3rd plural
| ils; eux-autres; ça; eusse3 || les || leur / y'eux / eux || se / s' || eux-autres; ça; eusse3|}
1. the formal second-person singular form is rarely used
2. nous is only present in formal language
3. eusse/euse is confined to the southeastern parishes of Louisiana

Immediately some distinct characteristics of Louisiana French can be gleaned from its personal pronouns. For example, the traditional third-person singular feminine pronoun elle  of Standard French is present but also there is the alternative of alle which is chosen by some authors since it more closely approximates speakers' pronunciation. Also, use of the pronoun ils has supplanted the third-person feminine pronoun elles as it is used to refer to both masculine and feminine subjects. Similarly, all of the other third-person plural pronouns are neutral. The usage of -autres with plural pronouns is widespread in the language.

Verbs
In order to demonstrate the use of some of the indicative verb tenses in Louisiana French, take the example of manger, meaning "to eat":

Some minor simplification of tenses is exhibited in the conjugation of the verb manger, namely of the plural first and second person conjugations which are inflected identically to the third person singular. Not only this, but the inflection of the third person plural verb form has diverged between the form identical to Standard French and the use of -ont in for all verbs.

The elision that is common in many aspects of French is accelerated in Louisiana French with the schwa in je often omitted regardless of the presence of a following vowel as well as the regular use of t'es (tu es) and t'as (tu as) as opposed to such avoidance in Standard French.

The present progressive tense of Louisiana French initially appears alien as compared to Standard French but après/apé possesses the same function signified by en train de.

Contractions
Unlike Standard French, vernacular Louisiana French may avoid article-preposition contractions involving the prepositions de or des:

"I learned from the grandparents."
Louisiana French: "J'ai appris de les grand-parents."Standard French: "J'ai appris des grand-parents."
"the skylight"
Louisiana French: "la lumière de le ciel"Standard French: "la lumière du ciel"Such contraction avoidance is a purely oral phenomenon, and written registers in Louisiana do not highly differ from Standard French. In novels, newspapers, government documents, plays, letters, etc., written from the colonial era to the early twentieth century, it would be unusual to see de le used in place of du, or de les in place of des. Proper names 
Place names in Louisiana French may differ from those in Standard French. For instance, locales named for American Indian tribes usually use the plural article les instead of the masculine or feminine singular articles le or la. Likewise, the contraction aux (à and les) is used with such locations. This trend seems to vary by region since in Pierre Part and Lafayette elderly francophones have often been heard to say la Californie, le Texas, la Floride. In informal Louisiana French, most US states and countries are pronounced as in English and therefore require no article but in formal Louisiana French, prefixed articles are absent: Californie, Texas, Floride, Belgique, Liban, etc.

Code-switching
Code-switching occurs frequently in Louisiana French but this is typical for many language contact situations. Code-switching was once viewed as a sign of poor education, but it is now understood to be an indication of proficiency in the two different languages that a speaker uses. Fluent Louisiana French speakers frequently alternate between French, English, and Creole, but less proficient speakers usually do not.

Vocabulary
From a lexical perspective, Louisiana French differs little from other varieties of French spoken in the world. However, due to the unique history and development of the language, Louisiana French has many words that are unique to it or to select French varieties.

 The Louisiana French expression is also used at times in Canadian French, with "un soulier" used formally and other expressions used informally.

Native American influences

 English influences 

Creole influences
Francophones and creolophones have worked side-by-side, lived among one another, and have enjoyed local festivities together throughout the history of the state. As a result, in regions where both Louisiana French and Louisiana Creole are or used to be spoken, the inhabitants of the region often code-switch, beginning the sentence in one language and completing it in another.Ingrid Neumann. Le Créole de Breaux Bridge, Louisiane. Etude morphosyntaxique, textes, vocabulaire. H. Buske, 1985.Peter A. Machonis. "The Origins and Evolution of French and Creole in Louisiana." The African Diaspora and Creolization. Broward County, FL, 2006: 23-28.

 Varieties 
Taxonomies for classing Louisiana French have changed over time. Until the 1960s and 1970s, Louisianans themselves, when speaking in French, referred to their language as français or créole. In English, they referred to their language as "Creole French" and "French" simultaneously."Le problème de la démarcation des variétés de langues en Louisiane: étiquettes et usages linguistiques." Le français en Amérique du nord: état présent. Ed. Albert Valdman, Julie Auger, and Deborah Piston-Hatlen. Québec: Les Presses de l'Université de Laval, 2005. 349-367.Michael D. Picone. "Enclave Dialect Contradiction: an external overview of Louisiana French." American Speech 72(2), Summer 1997. 117-153.

In 1968, Lafayette native James Domengeaux, a former US Representative, created the Council for the Development of French in Louisiana (CODOFIL), whose mission was to oversee the promotion, visibility, and expansion of French language usage in Louisiana. His mission was clear: (re)create a European French bastion in Louisiana by making all Louisianans bilingual in International French and English. To accomplish his goals, he teamed up with political leaders in Canada and France, including former French President Georges Pompidou. He found Louisiana French too limiting, so he imported francophone teachers from Europe, Canada and the Caribbean to teach normative French in Louisiana schools. His penchant for International French caused him to lose support in Louisiana: most Louisianans, if they were going to have French in Louisiana schools, wanted Louisiana French, not "Parisian French."Becky Brown. "The Development of a Louisiana French Norm." French and Creole in Louisiana. Ed. Albert Valdman. Springer, 1997: 215-220.Constantino Ghini et al. Statewide CODOFIL Program of French Instruction in the Elementary Grades, 1974-75, Evaluation Report. Baton Rouge and New Orleans: Ghini & Associates and Louisiana State Department of Education, 1975.Michael Hebert. "CODOFIL et l'enseignement du français en Louisiane (CODOFIL and the teaching of French in Louisiana)." Louisiana Review 3(1), 1974: 93-95.Anne L. Simon. "CODOFIL: A case study of an ethnic interest group." MA Thesis, University of Southwestern Louisiana, 1977.

Simultaneously, an ethnic movement took root in southern Louisiana led by Acadian-Creoles like James Donald Faulk, Dudley Joseph Leblanc and Jules O. Daigle. Faulk, a French teacher in Crowley, Louisiana, introduced using the term "Cajun French" for Acadian-Creoles and French Creoles who identified as Cajun, for which he created a curriculum guide for institutionalizing the language in schools in 1977. Roman Catholic Priest Jules O. Daigle, who in 1984 published his Dictionary of the Cajun Language, followed him. "Cajun French" is intended to imply the French spoken in Louisiana by descendants of Acadians, an ethnic qualifier rather than a linguistic relationship.

In 2009, Iberia Parish native and activist Christophe Landry introduced three terms representing lexical differences based on Louisiana topography: Provincial Louisiana French (PLF), Fluvial Louisiana French (FLF), and Urban Louisiana French (ULF). That same year, the Dictionary of Louisiana French: As Spoken in Cajun, Creole, and American Indian Communities, was published. It was edited by a coalition of linguists and other activists. The title clearly suggests that the ethno-racial identities are mapped onto the languages, but the language, at least linguistically, remains shared across those ethno-racial lines.

Due to present ethnic movements and internal subdivisions among the population, some of the state's inhabitants insist on ancestral varieties. As a result, it is not odd to hear the language referred to as Canadian French, Acadian French, Broken French, Old French, Creole French, Cajun French, and so on. Still other Louisiana francophones will simply refer to their language as French, without qualifiers. Internally, two broad distinctions will be made: informal Louisiana French and formal Louisiana French.Sylvie Dubois, William Gautreau, Howard Margot, Megan Melançon, Tracy Veler. "The Quality of French Spoken in Louisiana: Linguistic Attitudes toward the Varieties of French in Cajun Communities."SECOL Review 19, 1995: 126-150.

Informal Louisiana French
Probably the widely used variety of the language, informal Louisiana French has its roots in agrarian Louisiana, but it is now also found in urban centers because of urbanization beginning in the 20th century. Historically, along the prairies of southwest Louisiana, francophone Louisianans were cattle grazers as well as rice and cotton farmers. Along the bayous and the Louisiana littoral, sugar cane cultivation dominated and in many parishes today, sugar cultivation remains an important source of economy. Informal Louisiana French can at least be divided further into three core varieties: Fluvial, Provincial, and Bayou Lafourche Louisiana French.

The phonology of these varieties, apart from some minor distinctions, are rather similar and distinct in comparison to the international francophone community. A key feature of the dialect would likely be the pronunciation of the letter "r" as an alveolar consonant  rather than a uvular consonant like in Standard French. Vowels are commonly omitted from the beginning and end of for words: "américain → méricain" or "espérer → spérer." Likewise, the letter "é" preceding "o" frequently erodes in the spoken informal varieties: "léonide → lonide" or "cléophas → clophas." The nasality and pitch of the language is akin to that associated with provincial speech in Québec. In terms of nasality, Louisiana French is similar to French spoken in Brussels and Dakar, Senegal. The pitch of Provincial Louisiana French and Provincial Quebec French share a predominantly agricultural history, close contact with Amerindian groups and relative isolation from urbanized populations.Albert Valdman. "Recherches lexicographiques sur le français régional de Louisiane." Le français des Dictionnaires. L'autre versant de la lexicographie française. Claudine Bavoux. Brussels: Champs linguistiques Université de Boeck, 2008: 127-139.

Bayou Lafourche
Particular mention should be made to the francophones of Bayou Lafourche, who speak a linguistic feature that is absent everywhere else in Louisiana. Some francophones along Bayou Lafourche pronounce the letters "g" and "j" as a voiceless glottal fricative, but others pronounce the two letters in the manner of most other francophones."The French Spoken in La Fourche Parish, Louisiana," diss., University of North Carolina, Chapel Hill, 1950.

Two theories exist to explain the feature:

 Some activists and linguists attribute this feature to an inheritance of Acadian French spoken in Nova Scotia, New Brunswick and other Canadian maritime provinces, a theory based entirely on observation of shared vocal features rather than the communities being linked by migration.Robert A. Papen. Louisiana "Cajun" French: A grammatical sketch of the French dialect spoken on Bayou Lafourche (Lafourche Parish). Unpublished manuscript, 1972.
 On the other hand, it has been suggested that there may be a linguistic link to the Spanish-speaking Isleños living at the Mississippi River and Bayou Lafourche junction.

The Louisiana Creole spoken in Lafourche Parish in and around Kraemer, Choctaw, and Chackbay contains the letters "g" and "j", but they are voiced as they are in all other varieties of Louisiana and French spoken elsewhere.

Formal Louisiana French
This variety is known for its use in all administrative and ecclesiastic documents, speeches and in literary publications. Also known as Urban Louisiana French, Colonial French, or Plantation Society French, it is spoken primarily in the urban business centers of the state. Because those regions have historically been centers of trade and commerce with contact with French speakers from Europe, it is regarded as a more conservative variety of the language. Areas where this formal variety can be heard include New Orleans, Baton Rouge, St. Martinville, and other once important francophone business centers in the state. Generally formal Louisiana French is maintained along strict class lines.

The phonology of formal Louisiana French shares much in common with Standard French to various degrees depending upon the speaker. As an example, speakers can be heard pronouncing "r" as a uvular constant as opposed to an alveolar. Furthermore, the pronunciation and intonation of this variety can vary from European to the North American varieties of French. Use of the pronouns nous and vous is far more prevalent in this register, whereas nous has been supplanted by on in the informal varieties.

Phonology
Consonants

Louisiana French consonants do not show severe differences from Metropolitan French consonants, except that unlike most of French spoken varieties, which use uvular varieties of r ; Louisiana French uses the Classic alveolar trill or flap , just like in Spanish, Italian, and several other Romance languages; e.g. français  'French'.

E.g. arbre  →  'tree', possible  →  'possible', astre  →  →  'star', juste  'fair, just'.

The degree of palatalization depends on the speaker; e.g. petit  'small, little'.

In some mesolects, just like in Haitian Creole, general pronunciation may become non-rhotic; e.g. parler  →  'to speak'.

Vowels

The  distinction seldom exists in Louisiana French. However, a is usually pronounced  when making up the diphthong , before  and when being the last open syllable; e.g. fois  'time' (frequence), mardi  'Tuesday', rat  'rat'.

The maître - mettre  distinction does not exist.

Like other French varieties,  can be omitted in fast speech, e.g. je peux  →  →  'I can'.

Like in Quebec French,  may become laxed , depending on the speaker; e.g. musique  'music'.

The four nasal vowels have evolved according to their own pattern, similarly, but not the same way, to French spoken by Haitians:  → ,  → ,  → ,  → .

Community

Healing practices
Folk healers, are still found throughout the state. During their rituals for healing, they use secret French prayers to God or saints for a speedy recovery. These healers are mostly Catholic and do not expect compensation or even thanks, as it is said that then, the cure will not work.Ellen M. Daigle. Traiteurs and Their Power of Healing: The Story of Doris Bergeron. Louisiana Folklore Miscellany 6 (4), 1991: 43-48.

 Music 
Louisiana French has been the traditional language for singing music now referred to as Cajun, zydeco, and Louisiana French rock. As of today, Old French music, Creole stomp, and Louisiana French rock remain the only three genres of music in Louisiana using French instead of English. Most "Cajun" artists have expressions and phrases in French in songs, predominantly sung in English.Rick Olivier and Ben Samdel. Zydeco! University Press of Mississippi, 1999.

Cultural Institutions

French-language events
 Festival International de Louisiane
 Festivals Acadiens Et Créoles
 Association louisianaise des clubs français des écoles secondaires
 Francophone Open Microphone, Houma, Louisiana
 Louisiana Creole Families/Bastille Day Celebration, Ville Platte, Louisiana
Bastille Day Fête, New Orleans Art Museum, New Orleans Louisiana
 Louisiana State University Night of French Cinema, Baton Rouge, Louisiana 
Rendez-vous des Cajuns, Liberty Theater, Eunice, Louisiana

 La table française 
Today one can find many local groups dedicated to practicing Louisiana French regularly, usually over a meal with other interested parties. Many of said groups can be found through the online Cajun French Virtual Table Française:

Vermilion Parish Library, Abbeville, Louisiana
NuNu's, Arnaudville, Louisiana
La Madeleine's, Baton Rouge, Louisiana
City Cafe on O'Neal Lane, Baton Rouge, Louisiana
LSU Community Education Building Room C117, Eunice, Louisiana
Ascension Parish Library, Galvez, Louisiana
St. James Parish, Gramercy, Louisiana
Acadiana PoBoys & Cajun Cuisine, Lafayette, Louisiana
Dwyer's Café, Lafayette, Louisiana
Blue Moon Saloon, Lafayette, Louisiana
Carpe Diem, Lafayette, Louisiana
Chez Bi Bi's Patisserie, Lafayette, Louisiana
Johnston Street Java, Lafayette, Louisiana
Lafayette Public Library South, Lafayette, Louisiana
Paul and Lulu Hilliard University Art Museum, Lafayette, Louisiana
Restaurant Pamplona, Lafayette, Louisiana
Nanny's Restaurant, Marksville, Louisiana
Marrero Senior Center, Marrero, Louisiana
Victor's Cafeteria, New Iberia, Louisiana
Carrollton Table Francaise, New Orleans, Louisiana
Keller Library, New Orleans, Louisiana
Le Vieux Village, Opelousas, Louisiana
Java Square Cafe, Opelousas, Louisiana
Ascension Parish Library Galvez Branch, Prairieville, Louisiana
The Lafourche Central Market, Raceland, Louisiana
Frog City Travel Plaza, Rayne, Louisiana
The Bernard House, Rayne, Louisiana
Begnaud House Heritage Visitor Center, Scott, Louisiana
La Lafourche Parish Library, Thibodaux, Louisiana
Wetlands Acadian Cultural Center, Thibodaux, Louisiana
 French Quarter Cajun Seafood Restaurant, Houston, Texas

 Media 

Radio

KRVS 88.7:, Radio Acadie
KBON 101.1 FM: Louisiana Proud
KLEB 1600 AM: The Rajun' Cajun
KJEF 1290 AM: Cajun Radio
KVPI 1050 AM: The Legend
KVPI 92.5 FM: Acadiana's Greatest Hits

Periodicals, newspapers, & publicationsLes éditions TintamarreLa LouisianeLe Bourdon de la LouisianeLa revue de la Louisiane (defunct)

Cable networks

TV5 Monde
Louisiana Public Broadcasting (LPB)
KLFY TV10

Podcasts
Charrer-Veiller
LACréole Show

Multimedia platforms
New Niveau
Télé-Louisiane

Education
French-language Public School Curriculum

As of autumn 2011, Louisiana has French-language total immersion or bilingual French and English immersion in ten parishes: Calcasieu, Acadia, St. Landry, St. Martin, Iberia, Lafayette, Assumption, East Baton Rouge, Jefferson and Orleans. The curriculum in both the total French-language immersion as well as in the bilingual program follows the same standards as all other schools in the parish and state.

The Council for the Development of French in Louisiana (CODOFIL) recruits teachers locally and globally each year. Additionally, Les Amis de l'Immersion, Inc. is the parent-teacher organization for students in French immersion in the state which organizes summer camps, fundraisers and outreach for teachers, parents and students in the program.

CODOFIL Consortium of Louisiana Universities and Colleges
The Consortium of Louisiana Universities and Colleges unites representatives of French programs in Louisiana universities and colleges, and organizes post-secondary level francophone scholastic exchanges and provide support for university students studying French language and linguistics in Louisiana:

 Centenary College of Louisiana
 Delgado Community College
 Dillard University
 Grambling State University
 Louisiana College
 Louisiana State University
 Louisiana Tech University
 Loyola University
 McNeese State University
 Nicholls State University
 Northwestern State University
 Our Lady of Holy Cross College
 Southeastern Louisiana University
 Southern University at Baton Rouge
 Southern University at New Orleans
 Tulane University
 University of Louisiana at Lafayette
 University of Louisiana at Monroe
 University of New Orleans
 Xavier University of Louisiana

 Notable French-speaking people from Louisiana 

Micaela Almonester, Baroness de Pontalba
Barry Jean Ancelet
Étienne de Boré
Calvin Borel
P.G.T. Beauregard
Boozoo Chavis
Clifton Chenier
Kate Chopin
John Delafose
Rodolphe Desdunes
James R. Domengeaux
Michael Doucet
Edwin Edwards
Canray Fontenot
Virginie Amélie Avegno Gautreau
Richard Guidry
Sidonie de la Houssaye
Sybil Kein
John LaFleur II
Jean Lafitte
Iry LeJeune
Christophe Landry
Marie Laveau
Rosie Ledet
Alfred Mercier
Alexandre Mouton
Alfred Mouton
Stephen Ortego
Glen Pitre
Homère Plessy (of Plessy v. Ferguson)
Zachary Richard
Ambrose Sam
Mabel Sonnier Savoie
Ed Orgeron

See also

 List of Louisiana parishes by French-speaking population
 Louisiana Creole
 Acadian French
 Missouri French
 New England French
 American French
 French language in the United States
 Council for the Development of French in Louisiana

References

Further reading
 
 
 
 Cajun French Dictionary and Phrasebook by Clint Bruce and Jennifer Gipson . Hippocrene Books Inc.Tonnerre mes chiens! A glossary of Louisiana French figures of speech by Amanda LaFleur . Renouveau Publishing.A Dictionary of the Cajun Language by Rev. Msgr. Jules O. Daigle, M.A., S.T.L. . Swallow Publications, Inc.Cajun Self-Taught by Rev. Msgr. Jules O. Daigle, M.A., S.T.L. . Swallow Publications, Inc.Language Shift in the Coastal Marshes of Louisiana by Kevin J. Rottet . Peter Lang Publishing, Inc.Conversational Cajun French I by Harry Jannise and Randall P. Whatley . The Chicot Press.Dictionary of Louisiana French as Spoken in Cajun, Creole, and American Indian Communities, senior editor Albert Valdman.  Jackson: University Press of Mississippi, 2010.
Parker, J. L. (2019). Second language learning and cultural identity: Reconceptualizing the French curriculum in Louisiana colleges and universities. Journal of Curriculum Studies Research'', 1(1), 33-42. https://curriculumstudies.org/index.php/CS/article/view/7/3

External links

Council for the Development of French in Louisiana (CODOFIL)
Allons! An Introduction to Louisiana French
Cane River Valley French
Cajun French - Le français cajun, LSU
Creole Poems
Centenary University Bibliothèque Tintamarre Texts in Louisiana French
Télé-Louisiane
The NOUS Foundation
Le bijou sur le Bayou Teche
La Base de données lexicographiques de la Louisiane 
Cajun language websites
Terrebonne Parish French Online!
Cajun French Virtual Table Francaise
Cajun French Virtual Table Française

French language in the United States
Endangered Romance languages
Endangered diaspora languages
French dialects
French-American culture in Louisiana
Languages of Louisiana